A waste book was one of the books traditionally used in bookkeeping.  It consisted of a daily diary of all transactions in chronological order. It differs from a daybook in that only a single waste book is kept, rather than a separate daybook for each of several categories.  The waste book was intended for temporary use only; the information needed to be transcribed into a journal in order to begin to balance one's accounts.  The name of the book derives from the fact that, once its information was transferred to the journal, the waste book was unneeded.

The use of the waste book has declined with the advent of double-entry accounting.

Waste books were also used in the tradition of the commonplace book and note-taking. A well known example is Isaac Newton's Waste Book in which he did much of the development of the calculus. Another example is that of Georg Christoph Lichtenberg, who called his waste books sudelbücher, and which were known to have influenced Leo Tolstoy, Albert Einstein, Andre Breton, Friedrich Nietzsche, and Ludwig Wittgenstein.

In a general sense Cicero contrasted the short-lived memoranda of the merchant with the more carefully kept account book designed as a permanent record.
 
Francis Bacon compared one of his notebooks to a merchant’s waste book.

Francesco Sacchini recommended the use of two notebooks: “Not unlike attentive merchants... [who] keep two books, one small, the other large: the first you would call adversaria or a daybook (ephemerides), the second an account book (calendarium) and ledger (codex).”

References

Accounting systems
Note-taking